Roland Edge (born 25 November 1978) is an English footballer who is the assistant manager at non-league Folkestone Invicta.

Career

Gillingham 
Edge made his professional debut for Gillingham as a 40th minute substitute in a 1–0 away league loss to Chesterfield in September 1998. 

In just his second season with the Kent side Edge featured in the FA Cup quarter finals as Gillingham lost 5–0 to Chelsea at Stamford Bridge, and at Wembley as they defeated Wigan 3–2 in the Football League Second Division play-off Final to gain promotion to the second tier for the first time in the club's history. 

Edge would go on to make 125 league and cup appearances in six years with the Gills, but was released in 2003 after being unable to agree contract terms.

Hibernian 
After a period training with Hartlepool United Edge signed on a free transfer for Scottish Premier League side Hibernian in August 2003. 

During his one-season stay with the Leith side Edge played in the 2004 Scottish League Cup final, which Hibernian lost 2–0 to Livingston.

Hull City 
Edge joined Hull City of League One on a free transfer in July 2004. Hull were promoted to the Championship that season as runners up but Edge was limited to just 16 appearances in all competitions.

His contract was terminated by mutual consent in January 2006 after struggling with a long term injury.

Non-league 
Injuries curtailed Edge's professional career and he moved onto non-league Folkestone Invicta before joining Maidstone United. He re-joined Folkestone Invicta as a player-coach in June 2010. He was later appointed as Assistant Manager of the side.

He made his final of 178 total appearances for Folkestone Invicta.

Since leaving professional football Edge has worked as a teacher.

Honours 
Gillingham

 Football League Second Division play-offs: 2000

Hibernian

 Scottish League Cup: runners-up 2004
Hull City
 Football League One runner up: 2004–05
Folkestone Invicta
 Isthmian League Division One South Play Off runners up: 2013–14, 2014–15
 Isthmian League Division One South runners up: 2013–14, 2014–15

References

1978 births
English footballers
Association football defenders
Gillingham F.C. players
Hibernian F.C. players
Hull City A.F.C. players
Living people
Maidstone United F.C. players
People from Gillingham, Kent
Scottish Premier League players
English Football League players
Folkestone Invicta F.C. players